The JumpSTART pediatric triage MCI triage tool (usually shortened to JumpSTART) is a variation of the simple triage and rapid treatment (START) triage system. Both systems are used to sort patients into categories at mass casualty incidents (MCIs). However, JumpSTART was designed specifically for triaging children in disaster settings. Though JumpSTART was developed for use in children from infancy to age 8, where age is not immediately obvious, it is used in any patient who appears to be a child (patients who appear to be young adults are triaged using START).

JumpSTART was created in 1995 by Dr. Lou Romig, a pediatric emergency and disaster physician working at Miami Children's Hospital. After seeing the effects of Hurricane Andrew on the pediatric population, Dr. Romig became interested in pediatric disaster medicine and developed the JumpSTART tool. JumpSTART was modified in 2001.

Triage categories
Like START, JumpSTART sorts patients into four categories:

: Life-threatening injury; needs medical attention within the next hour

: Non-life-threatening injuries; needs medical attention, but treatment can be delayed a few hours

: Minor injuries; may need medical attention in the next few days ("the walking wounded")

: Deceased, or injuries so severe that life-saving treatment cannot be provided with the resources available

The JumpSTART algorithm

Step 1: Identify ambulatory patients
As with START, the triage clinician begins by instructing everyone who can walk to move to a designated area for treatment. All patients who are able to do this are immediately tagged green (minor). These patients are then fully triaged by a clinician assigned to the green area (secondary triage).

In the JumpStart system, infants are evaluated first in secondary triage, using the entire JumpStart algorithm. Other children who did not walk on their own, but were carried to the treatment area, are evaluated next.

Step 2: Is the patient breathing?

Yes

If the patient is breathing, the clinician proceeds to step 3.

No

As with START, an airway maneuver is first attempted. If the child starts breathing on their own, they are triaged red (immediate).
 
However, unlike START, patients who do not have a spontaneous return of respirations following an airway maneuver are not immediately triaged Black. First the clinician feels for a peripheral pulse. If the child is apneic with no peripheral pulse, they are triaged black (deceased/expectant).

If the child does have a palpable peripheral pulse, the clinician delivers five assisted ventilations. If the child remains apneic, they are triaged black. If the child has a return of spontaneous respirations, they are triaged red.

Step 3: Assess respiratory rate, perfusion, and mental status
The child is triaged red if:
 Their respiratory rate is under 15, or over 45; or
 They have no peripheral pulse; or
 Their mental status is age-inappropriate
 Mental status is assessed using the AVPU scale. Age-inappropriate mental statuses include inappropriate responses to pain or unresponsiveness
 Age-inappropriate mental status also includes posturing

To be triaged yellow, the child must:
 Have a respiratory rate between 15 and 45; and
 Have a palpable peripheral pulse; and
 Have an age-appropriate mental status (A, V, or P on the AVPU scale)

Literature review
As of 2016, there have been no studies of JumpSTART's validity or reliability in actual mass-casualty settings, though JumpSTART's discriminant validity has been established. Within the medical literature, the existing studies of JumpSTART generally examine its use in training or simulated MCI settings.

Several studies have found that medical providers easily learn the JumpSTART algorithm. For example, a study of prehospital and nursing personnel found that participants showed improvements in their ability to triage pediatric patients which were maintained over a 3-month period after training ceased. Similarly, a 2013 study found that medical residents in all postgraduate years easily learned the JumpSTART algorithm, with high inter-rater reliability in individual patient triage decisions. However, while reliability was high in patients with head injuries, it was low in ambulatory patients.

In a simulated pediatric mass casualty incident, JumpSTART was found to perform equally as well as SALT triage, which has been proposed as a new national standard for mass-casualty triage. However, JumpSTART was significantly faster than SALT, requiring eight seconds less per patient.

However, a 2006 study by two physicians in a South African emergency department was critical of the JumpSTART system. The study examined how four different tools would have performed if used to triage pediatric patients that presented at the authors' emergency department. The authors compared the START and JumpSTART systems with two other pediatric triage tools: the Pediatric Triage Tape and Care Flight. The study reported:
None of the tools showed high sensitivity and specificity. ... [T]he JumpSTART and START scores had very low sensitivities, which meant that they failed to identify patients with serious injury, and would have missed the majority of seriously injured casualties in the models of major incidents.

Further study is needed to evaluate JumpSTART's validity and reliability, particularly in real-life patient settings.

See also
 START triage
 RPM-30-2-Can Do (mnemonic for START and JumpSTART)
 Triage
 Mass casualty incident

References

External links
 Official JumpSTART website
 JumpSTART materials in Spanish (Spain), Spanish (Dominican Republic), French (Quebec), Italian, and Japanese

Triage